The 2014 Spengler Cup was an ice hockey competition held in Davos, Switzerland from December 26 to December 31, 2014. All matches were played at HC Davos's home known as Vaillant Arena. Six competing teams were split into two groups of three (in the round-robin series). The two groups, named Torriani and Cattini, were named after legendary Swiss hockey players Richard 'Bibi' Torriani and the Cattini brothers, Hans and Ferdinand.

Teams participating
The list of teams that participated in the tournament are as listed.

  HC Davos (host)
  Team Canada
  KHL Medveščak Zagreb
  Genève-Servette HC
  Jokerit
  Salavat Yulaev Ufa

Group stage

Key
 W (regulation win) – 3 pts.
 OTW (overtime/shootout win) – 2 pts.
 OTL (overtime/shootout loss) – 1 pt.
 L (regulation loss) – 0 pts.

Group Torriani

Group Cattini

Knockout stage

Quarterfinals

Semifinals

Final

Champions

All-Star Team

Statistics

Scoring leaders

GP = Games played; G = Goals; A = Assists; Pts = Points

References

External links
Spenglercup.ch
2014 Spengler Cup
2014 Spengler Cup

Spengler Cup
Spengler Cup
Spengler Cup
Spengler Cup
Spengler Cup
Spengler Cup
Spengler Cup